Sena Wendell Acolatse (born November 28, 1990) is an American-Canadian professional ice hockey player who is currently an unrestricted free agent. He most recently played with the Iserlohn Roosters in the Deutsche Eishockey Liga (DEL).

Playing career
Prior to turning professional, Acolatse played major junior hockey in the Western Hockey League (WHL). Acolatse was drafted by the WHL's Seattle Thunderbirds in the 2005 Bantam Draft in the fourth round, 76th overall. Acolatse played in the WHL for five seasons. He played for Seattle for three and a half years before being traded to the Saskatoon Blades in January 2010. The Prince George Cougars acquired Acolatse from the Saskatoon Blades on October 3, 2010.

On April 3, 2011, the San Jose Sharks signed Acolatse as an undrafted free agent to a three-year entry-level contract. He was assigned to AHL affiliate, the Worcester Sharks, for the duration of his contract.

Upon completion of his entry-level deal, Acolatse was not tendered a qualifying offer from the Sharks, releasing him as a free agent. On July 3, 2014, Acolatse signed a one-year, two-way contract with the Calgary Flames. He was assigned to AHL affiliate, the Adirondack Flames for the 2014–15 season.

Acolatse suffered a repeat of the previous off-season in not being tendered by the Flames. On July 1, 2015, he was signed as a free agent to a one-year, two-way contract with the Florida Panthers. In the 2015–16 season, Acolatse was assigned to remain in the AHL with affiliate, the Portland Pirates. As a regular on the blueline with the Pirates, Acolatse appeared in 62 games with 13 points.

After a further two seasons with the Springfield Thunderbirds and Providence Bruins, Acolatse left the AHL at the conclusion of the 2017–18 season, agreeing to his first contract abroad on a one-year deal with German outfit, Straubing Tigers of the DEL on May 4, 2018. After three years in Straubing, Sena Acolatse moved to the Iserlohn Roosters in the summer of 2021.

In his second year with the Roosters in 2022–23, Acolatse matched his previous season totals with 23 points through 45 regular season games. With Iserlohn missing the playoffs for the second consecutive season, Acolatse left the club at the conclusion of his contract on March 10, 2023.

Career statistics

References

External links

1990 births
Adirondack Flames players
American men's ice hockey defensemen
Ice hockey players from California
Iserlohn Roosters players
Living people
Portland Pirates players
Prince George Cougars players
Providence Bruins players
Saskatoon Blades players
Seattle Thunderbirds players
Sportspeople from Hayward, California
Springfield Thunderbirds players
Straubing Tigers players
Worcester Sharks players